The Journey of Allen Strange is an American television series that aired on Nickelodeon's SNICK block of programming for three seasons from November 1997 to April 2000.

Premise
The series follows the story of a young Xelan alien (Arjay Smith) who is stranded on Earth, and meets up with a young girl Robbie Stevenson (Erin J. Dean), her younger brother Josh (Shane Sweet), and their father Ken (Jack Tate). This family eventually adopts him, giving him the name "Allen Strange". He has extraordinary powers, including the ability to turn into his alien form, which allows him to hover. He uses his abilities to bring a mannequin in a sporting goods store to life; this "animated mannequin" poses as his Earth father, Manfred, for events like parent-teacher conferences. He also possesses extremely high intelligence and can read incredibly fast by simply placing his hand on the cover of a book. He also seems to have advanced dexterity and athletic muscle memory, as he once observed a neighborhood basketball game and perfectly duplicated the trajectory of shots when he attempted this himself. He has an affinity for canned cheese, and lives in the family's attic in a strange alien cocoon. Allen's ultimate goal is to return to his homeworld of Xela, but he admits that may be a long time away as he stowed away on an exploratory ship which was studying Earth, which had to flee out of fear of discovery.

Allen said he "chose" to disguise himself as an African-American boy as the first Earth people he spied upon were some African-American men playing basketball, and figured this was a way to acculturate. His naivety on the subject (bringing in plain black posterboards for his Black History Month presentation) sparked a Black History Month episode, featuring him learning information about slavery and the Civil Rights Movement.

In the weeks leading up to the series' premiere, Nickelodeon ran a series of teaser ads which would at first appear to be promos for other shows, or for Nickelodeon in general, when a blue ooze would fill the screen as an announcer said cryptically, "Something strange is coming to SNICK. November 8". It would then clear out and the interrupted promo would conclude as if nothing had happened.

Characters

Main
Allen Strange (Arjay Smith) – A Xelan alien disguised as a human – all he wishes to do is to go back to his planet.
Roberta "Robbie" Stevenson (Erin J. Dean) – A 15-year-old girl who enjoys surfing and helps show Allen how to fit in with humans.
Joshua "Josh" Stevenson (Shane Sweet) – Robbie's 11-year-old younger brother and a science whiz.
Kenneth "Ken" Stevenson (Jack Tate) – an architect and Robbie and Josh's father who is unaware of Allen being an alien.

Recurring
Gail Stevenson (Mary Chris Wall) – a nurse and Robbie and Josh's mother who is separated from their father, but always comes to visit them.
Manfred Strange (Robert Crow) – Originally just a store mannequin, but was brought to life to serve as Allen's Earth father. He often helps Allen out of dangerous situations and is a good friend of Ken who nicknames him "Manny".
Latanya (Jaquita Ta'le) - Robbie's best friend who shares the same interests.
Harold "Moose" Johnson (Sean Babb) – The captain of the high school wrestling team and also a bully. Allen tries several times to befriend him after he unintentionally upsets him, but his strange habits only annoy him.
Erika (Evan Scott) - Robbie's other best friend.
Hamilton Gerrigan (Ethan Glazer) - A close friend of Allen who hangs out with him and Josh.
Phil Berg (Dee Bradley Baker) – Allen's recurring arch-enemy, a crazed alien hunter and journalist who constantly tries to capture Allen and expose him for a top news story. He was later captured by the Xelans' enemies, the Trykloids, and used as a pawn for information on Earth.
Shaw (J. Kenneth Campbell) - Allen's second arch-enemy, another sinister alien hunter whose face is barely shown and appearance is hidden with a big black fedora and a trench coat. He is the leader of the secret government agency A.R.C. (Alien Retrieval Commission).  He wants to capture Allen and lock him up to prove to the world that aliens exist. He sometimes teams up with Phil Berg to achieve this goal.

Episodes

Series overview

Season 1 (1997–1998)

Season 2 (1998–1999)

Season 3 (1999–2000)

Book series
An eight-book series, based on the episodes, was also printed, written by several authors, including John Vornholt and Mel Odom. A list of these books is available at the Internet Speculative Fiction Database.

References

 Book references

External links
 
 

1997 American television series debuts
2000 American television series endings
1990s American science fiction television series
2000s American science fiction television series
1990s American teen drama television series
2000s American teen drama television series
1990s Nickelodeon original programming
2000s Nickelodeon original programming
English-language television shows
Television series about families
Television series about teenagers
Television series about alien visitations
Television series about extraterrestrial life